Erebia cassioides, the common brassy ringlet, is a member of the subfamily Satyrinae of family Nymphalidae.

Subspecies 
Subspecies include:

Erebia cassioides cassioides – common brassy ringlet
Erebia cassioides arvernensis Oberthür 1908 - western brassy ringlet
Erebia cassioides carmenta Fruhstorfer, 1907 - western brassy ringlet
Erebia cassioides macedonica Buresch, 1918 (Bulgaria)
Erebia cassioides illyrica  Lorkovic, 1953
Erebia cassioides tonalensis  Arnscheid & Roos, 1976

On the basis of studies of enzymatic electrophoresis and of mitochondrial DNA the subspecies Erebia cassioides arvernensis should be considered a distinct species named Erebia dromus (Fabricius, 1793), which is distributed in the western Pyrenees, in the western Alps and in Apennines.

Distribution and habitat
This European endemic species is present in Spain (Cantabrian mountains, Pyrenees), France (Pyrenees, Massif Central and the western and eastern Alps), Italy, Switzerland, Romania (Carpathians), Bulgaria (Rila and Pirin Mountains.), Greece, North Macedonia and in the Balkans (Serbia, Montenegro, Albania and Bosnia). It prefers grassy slopes with stones and rocks at altitudes between 1,600 and 2,600 meters.

Description
The wingspan is 32–38 mm. These small butterflies have a brown forewings with a metallic-greenish shine, the so-called "brassy ringlet". On the forewings there is an orange postdiscal band and two small ocelli pupillated with white towards the apex. A series of small ocelli appears on the hindwings. The underside of the forewings is orange with a brownish border and two small ocelli at the apex, while the hindwings are shiny silvery gray and ocher.

Biology
The females lay their eggs close to the ground, usually on dry stalks of grass.  The larvae feed on various grasses (Festuca ovina, Poa species, Nardus stricta), including Gramineae species. The caterpillar hibernates in the first or second larval instar and pupates the following year between June and August. Adults fly from July to September with a peak in August.

Gallery

Bibliography
Albre (Jérôme), Gers (Charles) & Legal (Luc), 2008. Taxonomic notes on the species of the Erebia tyndarus group (Lepidoptera, Nymphalidae, Satyridae). Lépidoptères- Revue des Lépidoptéristes de France, vol. 17- N°39 : 12 - 28.
Guide des papillons d'Europe et d'Afrique du Nord de Tom Tolman, Richard Lewington, éditions Delachaux et Niestlé, 1998 -
van Swaay, C., Wynhoff, I., Verovnik, R., Wiemers, M., López Munguira, M., Maes, D., Sasic, M., Verstrael, T., Warren, M. & Settele, J. 2010. Erebia cassioides.

References

External links 
 Paolo Mazzei, Daniel Morel, Raniero Panfili Moths and Butterflies of Europe and North Africa
 Pyrgus.de

Erebia
Butterflies of Europe
Butterflies described in 1792